The Ariane was a French automobile made by Automobiles Ariane, Suresnes, Seine in 1907.  It was a small friction-drive two-seater using a single-cylinder 6 hp engine.  The friction discs were mounted at the rear axle.

Defunct motor vehicle manufacturers of France
Suresnes